A list of fellows of the Royal Society elected in 1929.

Fellows 

Arthur John Allmand
Arthur Henry Reginald Buller
Sir Charles Drummond Ellis
Sir Ronald Aylmer Fisher
George Ridsdale Goldsbrough
Sir James Gray
Sir Cyril Norman Hinshelwood
Augustus Daniel Imms
Piotr Leonidovich Kapitza
William Dickson Lang
John Mellanby
Henry Stanley Raper
Sir Harry Ralph Ricardo
Harold Roper Robinson
Frederick William Twort

References

1929
1929 in science
1929 in the United Kingdom